Ensenada de la Broa is a bay in southern Cuba. The bay is a part of the Gulf of Batabano.

Bays of Cuba